Carlson is a patronymic surname meaning "son of Carl". It is used as a given name rarely. There are variations to the spelling. People with the name Carlson or its variant spellings include:

Surname

 A. J. Carlson (1875–1956), Swedish American physiologist
 Amy Carlson (born 1968), American actress
 Arne Carlson (born 1934), Governor of the State of Minnesota
 Brad Carlson (born 1950), American drummer (formerly of Cheap Trick) better known as Bun E. Carlos
 Catherine Carlson, Canadian judge in Manitoba
 Charlie Carlson (born 1943), Author and film producer in Florida
 Chester Carlson (1906–1968), American physicist, inventor, and patent attorney
 Christian Thomsen Carl (1676-1713), also referred to as Carlson, Danish navy officer
 Clifford Carlson (1894–1964), American, University of Pittsburgh basketball coach, physician for Carnegie Steel Company
 Dan Carlson (born 1970), American baseball player and coach
 Daniel Carlson (born 1995), American football player
 David Carlson (born 1952), American composer
 Doug Carlson (1939–2013), American politician
 Dylan Carlson (baseball) (born 1998), American baseball player
 Dylan Carlson (musician) (born 1968), American, band member of band Earth
 Edward Carlson (1911–1990), American, Seattle civic leader
 Emily Carlson (born 1983), American, figure skater, broadcast journalist
 Evans Carlson (1896–1947), USMC leader in World War II
 Frank Carlson (1893–1987), American politician
 Fritz Carlson (1888–1952), Swedish mathematician
 George Alfred Carlson (1876-1926) American politician, governor of Colorado
 Grace Carlson (1906 – 1992), American Marxist politician
 Gretchen Carlson (born 1966), American television personality and former Miss America
 Gustaf Carlson (1894 – 1942), Swedish footballer
 JB Carlson (born 1974), American founder, Chief Executive, CTB, of entities engaged in utilizing B-corps, disruptive technology, two-sided markets. Mr. Carlson's last name is Patronymic because his father's name is Carl.   Mr Carlson also serves the United Nations.
 Jeffrey Carlson (born 1975), American actor
 Joel D. Carlson (born 1960), American businessman and politician
 John Carlson (disambiguation)
 Karen Carlson (born 1945), American actress
 Kelly Carlson (born 1976), American actress
 Kevin Carlson (born 1962), American puppeteer and film special-effects expert
 Kyle and Lane Carlson (born 1978), American models
 Len Carlson (1937–2006), Canadian voice actor
 Linda Carlson (born 1945), American actress
 Lynda Carlson (born 1943), American statistician)
 Margaret Carlson, American journalist
 Margery C. Carlson (1892–1985), American botanist
 Molly Carlson (b. 1998), Canadian high diver
 Paul Carlson (1928–1964), American medical missionary
 Paulette Carlson (born 1952), American singer
 Ray Carlson (born 1948), South African rugby union player
 Richard Carlson (actor) (1912–1977), American
 Richard Carlson (author) (1961–2006), American
 Robert James Carlson (born 1944), American, Roman Catholic bishop
 Robert S. Carlson, American college sports coach
 Roy Carl Carlson  (1937 – 2011), American politician
 Sannie Carlson (born 1970), Danish Eurodance singer better known as Whigfield
 Shawn Carlson (born 1960), American physicist, science writer, and a STEM educator
 Stephanie Carlson, American evolutionary ecologist
 Stephen Carlson (born 1996), American football player
 Tom Carlson (born 1941), Nebraska politician
 Tucker Carlson (born 1969), American news pundit
 Veronica Carlson (1944–2022), English model and actress
 William H. Carlson (1864–1937), American politician
 William S. Carlson (1905 – 1994), explorer of Greenland and former President of four universities

Given name
 Carlson Gracie (1935 - 2006), Brazilian martial artist
 Carlson Young (born 1990), American actress
 Christy Carlson Romano (born 1984), American actress, dancer, author and singer

See also

Carlon
 Carlsen (disambiguation)
 Carlson (disambiguation)
 Carlsson (disambiguation)
 Carlston (name)
 Karlson (disambiguation)
 Karlsson (disambiguation)
 Andrew Carlssin
 Jim Carlson (disambiguation)

Patronymic surnames
Surnames from given names